Sunrise Media Limited owned The Sunday Business Post and own Cork publisher Webprint Concepts. The major shareholder in Sunrise Media Limited is Key Capital. Key Capital's shareholders include Conor Kileen. The CEO of Sunrise Media Limited is Siobhan Lennon.

Sunrise Media Limited was set up on 11 July 2016, and is an Irish company with an address registered at Huguenot House, St Stephen's Green, Dublin 2.

In May 2017, it was reported that Sunrise Media Limited were looking at the possibility of acquiring the Irish Examiner from Landmark Media Investments.

In September 2017, it was reported that The Sunday Business Post and Webprint Concepts might be up for sale.

In September 2018, Sunrise Media sold The Sunday Business Post to Enda O'Coineen.

References

Irish companies established in 2015
Companies based in Dublin (city)
Newspaper companies of Ireland
Publishing companies established in 2015
Publishing companies of the Republic of Ireland
Privately held companies of Ireland